Black Horse is an unincorporated community in West Sadsbury Township, Chester County, Pennsylvania, in the U.S. state of Pennsylvania.

References

Unincorporated communities in Chester County, Pennsylvania
Unincorporated communities in Pennsylvania